Trawscoed fort is a Roman auxiliary fort in Ceredigion, Wales, located near the modern settlement of Trawsgoed and is cut through by the modern B4340 road. It was first built in the 70s AD. and was occupied until around 130 AD, housing up to 800 infantry in rows of barracks within the  banked enclosure. At its height it could have had a total population of around 2,000 people living at the fort and its extramural vicus. It overlooks the Roman bridge over the River Ystwyth, which is where the road from Pen-Ilwyn to Llanio crosses. Later explorations increased the knowledge of this site.

Description 
The rampart had a gate in each side, and its corners were rounded. Inside the fort, there were rows of barracks for up to 800 infantry. The commander's house, granaries, and headquarters were situated alongside the central range. There were also settlements and other ancillary features outside the walls and ditch. There is evidence that the whole settlement was built and rebuilt at least three times in all.

The fort is situated towards the north end of a string of such forts, built along a connecting road that led from the legionary fortress at Caerleon. The principle forts are spaced to be a day's march from their neighbour, allowing safe movement of troops across what would at least initially have been hostile territory.

Initial exploration 
Exploration of the northeastern portion of the fort revealed evidence of a large timber building. This evidence was the trench left by the remains of a wall running along the northwest-southeast axis. There were also two metal-clad post holes. Another building aligned in the same direction was beside the via decumana, evidenced by two wall trenches 7.8m apart and 6.8m long. A cobbled yard lay just to the east of this building. A clay oven was found in 1984 inside this building; however, this clay oven may not be contemporary with the building, and its location might just be a coincidence. This oven was sealed with clay after a fire was built during the Flavian dynasty. Further wall trenches were dug through the remains of this building, and they indicate the presence of a later building 8.5m long and 6.75m wide with a passageway on the eastern side. Two drains aligned on the northwest-southeast axis cut through this building. The occupation of this site occurred during 70 to 120 AD, with a period of abandonment around 100 AD.

Recent exploration 
In November 2005, Trawscoed fort was explored using fluxgate gradiometer surveys by David Hopewell. They collected the data by dividing this rectangle up into  by  square plots. They then surveyed each plot by walking along the length of the plot, taking readings every . The researchers then took this data and used Geoplot 3.0 software to generate X-Y waterfall plots and greyscale maps of the region. The waterfall plots were made by plotting each traversal of a plot on a trace, which enabled anomalies to be easily seen.

Interpretation of the results 
High readings in the magnetic map were caused by pieces of iron and fences. Any locations where fire was, such as kilns and burning wooden structures, also increased the amount of magnetic response.

The results 
David Hopewell reports that "The northern corner of the fort shows up clearly on the grey-scale plot", and sections of the ramparts showed evidence of burning. He found a ditch which circumscribed the fort just outside the walls. To the northeast of this area he found a large, strong magnetic response which indicates that a bank once existed in this area. In the northern and eastern quadrants of the fort were blocks of six barracks each.

Hopewell also scanned some of the area around the fort, and he wrote that there was a road leading to the northeast gate. He recorded finding small anomalies on either side of the gate, which may indicate the presence of what was once a guard tower. Large areas of indications of burning imply that there may have been buildings that had burned down. The rest of the area to the northeast contains faint parallel striations in the magnetic map, which may indicate ploughing, followed by spots which may have been campfires. Jeffrey Davies' excavation trench, which he dug in 1974, caused a large line of static.

Protecting the site 
Until very recently, the fort was covered with gorse bushes. This plant has invasive roots, and scientists were worried that it might be damaging the remains of Trawscoed Fort. A group from FC Wales removed the gorse, and foresters laid down hay from the nearby Penrhyncoch meadow. The seeds contained in the hay will fall down and germinate, thus replacing the gorse with a layer of grass. This will have the added benefit of attracting birds and butterflies to the site.

See also 

 Scheduled monuments in Ceredigion

Further reading
 BBCS xxxi (1984). pp. 259–292
 Britannia xvi (1985), p. 255
 Britannia xvii (1986), p. 366

References

External links 
 Geophysical plot of Trawscoed fort
 Satellite image of the fort

Hillforts in Ceredigion
Archaeological sites in Ceredigion
Scheduled monuments in Wales